Jaylen Marselles Brown (born October 24, 1996) is an American professional basketball player for the Boston Celtics of the National Basketball Association (NBA). He played one year of college basketball for the California Golden Bears, being named first-team all-conference and Freshman of the Year in the Pac-12 Conference.

Declaring for the 2016 NBA draft after his freshman season, Brown was selected by the Celtics with the third overall pick. As a professional, he has split his time between shooting guard and small forward. Brown is a two-time NBA All-Star, and he helped the Celtics reach the  2022 NBA Finals.

High school career

Brown attended Wheeler High School in Marietta, Georgia. As a senior, he helped lead his team to victory in the Georgia High School Association (GHSA) Class 6A State Championship. With 0.6 seconds remaining, Brown hit two free throws to give Wheeler a 59–58 win. More highlights of Brown's senior season include 28 points and 11 rebounds in a 76–70 win against Harry Giles and Wesleyan Christian Academy; a 24 point and 8 rebound performance in a 61–40 win over Malik Monk and Bentonville High School; 25 points, 12 rebounds and 6 assists in a 75–65 win over Ben Simmons and Montverde Academy; and 29 points and 15 rebounds against Huntington Prep. As a senior, Brown averaged 28 points and 12 rebounds while leading Wheeler to a 30–3 overall record.

Brown won a 2014 FIBA Americas Championship gold medal as part of the USA Basketball Men's U18 National Team. He was also selected to play in the 2015 McDonald's All-American Boys Game. At the conclusion of an outstanding high school career, Brown was named Gatorade Georgia Boys Player of the Year, USA Today's All-USA Georgia Player of the Year, Georgia's Mr. Basketball, and the Class 6A Player of the Year.

Recruiting
Brown was rated a five-star recruit and ranked by Scout, ESPN, and 247Sports as the fourth best recruit in his class behind Ben Simmons, Skal Labissière, and Brandon Ingram. Rivals ranked him third in his class.

On May 1, 2015, Brown committed to play for the Golden Bears at the University of California, Berkeley, under coach Cuonzo Martin and alongside fellow top-recruit Ivan Rabb. He was heralded as an all-around prospect due to his athleticism.

College career
Brown took a masters-level class in Berkeley's Cultural Studies of Sport in Education program during his first semester in college. He also gained some fluency in Spanish, stating a goal of learning three more languages by the age of 25.

While playing for the Golden Bears in 2015–16, Brown averaged 14.6 points, 5.4 rebounds, and 2.0 assists in 27.6 minutes per game over 34 games. He had his best scoring games on November 27, 2015, against Richmond and January 27, 2016, against Utah, recording 27 points in each game. He had a season-high 11 rebounds twice during victories on November 23, 2015, against Sam Houston State and on January 1, 2016, against Colorado. On January 23, 2016, Brown recorded a season-high 7 assists to go with 15 points in a 74–73 victory over Arizona. Brown earned first-team All-Pac-12 honors and was named the Pac-12 Freshman of the Year.

Professional career

Boston Celtics (2016–present)

2016–17 season: Rookie season

On June 23, 2016, Brown was selected by the Boston Celtics with the third overall pick in the 2016 NBA draft. On July 27, he signed his rookie scale contract with the Celtics after averaging 16.0 points, 6.2 rebounds and 2.3 steals in six Summer League games. He made his debut for the Celtics in their season opener on October 26 against the Brooklyn Nets, scoring nine points on 3-for-4 shooting, while adding two blocked shots in 19-plus minutes. In his first career start on November 3, Brown scored 19 points in a 128–122 loss to the Cleveland Cavaliers. On January 27, 2017, he scored a then career-high 20 points in a 128–98 win over the Orlando Magic. Brown helped the Celtics claim the No. 1 seed in the Eastern Conference, before helping them advance through to the Eastern Conference Finals, where they were defeated by the Cavaliers in five games. Brown had a productive rookie season in 2016–17, with his role off the bench continuing to develop as the year went on. He appeared in 78 games for the Celtics during the regular season, with 20 starts. He averaged 17.2 minutes on the floor, 6.6 points, 2.8 rebounds and 0.8 assists. At the season's end, he was named to the NBA All-Rookie Second Team.

2017–18 season: Sophomore season
In the Celtics' 2017–18 season opener against the Cavaliers on October 17, 2017, Brown scored a then career-high 25 points in a 102–99 loss. On November 18, he set a then career-high with 27 points and helped the Celtics win their 15th straight game with a 110–99 victory over the Atlanta Hawks. On December 13 he had a 26-point effort against the Denver Nuggets. Brown missed two weeks in March 2018 with a concussion. On April 6, 2018, he set a then career-high with 32 points in a 111–104 win over the Chicago Bulls. In Game 2 of the Celtics' first-round playoff series against the Milwaukee Bucks, Brown had a then playoff career-high 30 points in helping Boston take a 2–0 series lead with a 120–106 win. At age 21, Brown became the youngest player in Celtics history to score 30 or more points in a playoff game. In Game 4, Brown set a new playoff career-high and scored a career-high 34 points in a 104–102 loss. The Celtics went on to win the series in seven games, with Brown sitting out the second-round series opener with a strained right hamstring. He returned to action in Game 2 against the Philadelphia 76ers, scoring 13 points off the bench in a 108–103 win, helping the Celtics take a 2–0 series lead. In Game 5, Brown scored 24 points in a 114–112 series-clinching win. In Game 6 of the Eastern Conference Finals, Brown scored 27 points in a 109–99 loss to the Cavaliers.

2018–19 season: Struggles
Brown struggled to start the season, with the Boston Globe criticizing him for taking too many two-point jump shots and an overall "lack of focus and discipline". After the Celtics unexpectedly started the season with 10 wins and 10 losses, ESPN's Jackie MacMullan wrote that "nobody disappointed [the Celtics] more than Brown." On December 6, Brown returned after missing three games with a bruised lower back and scored 21 points in a 128–100 win over the New York Knicks. Two days later, he scored a game-high 23 points in a 133–77 win over the Chicago Bulls. On December 31, he had a season-high 30 points in a 120–111 loss to the San Antonio Spurs.

2019–20 season: Breakthrough
Brown signed a four-year, $115 million contract extension with the Celtics. He tied his career-high 34 points this season against the Cleveland Cavaliers on December 28, 2019. In January, he narrowly missed being selected to the 2020 NBA All-Star Game. In the 2020 playoffs, the Celtics advanced to the Eastern Conference Finals for the third time in Brown's four years in the NBA following series victories over the Philadelphia 76ers and Toronto Raptors in four and seven games, respectively. However, Boston was eliminated in those Conference Finals by the Miami Heat in six games.

2020–21 season: First All-Star appearance
On December 30, 2020, Brown scored a then career-high 42 points along with five rebounds and four assists in a 126–107 win over the Memphis Grizzlies. On February 24, 2021, Brown was selected to the 2021 All-Star team as a reserve, his first time being named an NBA All-Star. On April 15, Brown scored 40 points in a 121–113 win over the Los Angeles Lakers. Brown's career-best season ended with only four regular season games left to be played, as he had to undergo wrist surgery for a torn scapholunate ligament in his left wrist.

2021–22 season: First NBA Finals appearance
On October 20, 2021, in the Celtics' season-opener, Brown recorded a then career-high 46 points in a 138–134 double overtime loss to the New York Knicks while also setting a Celtics franchise record for points on an opening night. On January 2, 2022, Brown surpassed that career-high, scoring 50 points, along with 11 rebounds, in a 116–111 overtime victory over the Orlando Magic. On January 8, Brown recorded his first career triple-double with 22 points, 11 rebounds and 11 assists in a 99–75 win over the New York Knicks. On March 18, in a 126–97 win over the Sacramento Kings, Brown and Jayson Tatum each scored at least 30 points in the same game for the fourth time in the season and eight time overall; tying the record for the most such games with fellow Celtics' Larry Bird and Kevin McHale, who also recorded four such games in the 1986–87 NBA season. The following game, in a 124–104 victory over the Denver Nuggets, Brown and Jayson Tatum broke the record by both scoring 30 points with over 60% shooting from the field.

On 3 May, in Game 2 of the Eastern Conference Semifinals, Brown scored 25 of his 30 points in the first half along with 6 rebounds, 6 assists and 2 steals in a 109–86 win over the reigning-champion Milwaukee Bucks. Four days later, he posted 27 points, 12 rebounds and 4 assists in a 103–101 Game 3 loss. On May 21, in Game 3 of the Eastern Conference Finals, Brown scored a playoff career-high 40 points on 14-of-20 shooting from the field in a 109–103 loss against the Miami Heat. In Game 7 of the series, Brown logged 24 points, 6 rebounds and 6 assists in a 100–96 victory over the Heat, advancing to the NBA Finals for the first time in his career, and the Celtics' first NBA Finals appearance since 2010. In Game 1 of the Finals, Brown posted 24 points, seven rebounds and five assists in a 120–108 win over the Golden State Warriors. In Game 3 of the Finals, Brown logged 27 points, nine rebounds and five assists in a 116–100 win over the Golden State Warriors to take a 2–1 series lead. Boston would go on to lose to Golden State in six games despite Brown’s 34-point outing in the 103–90 close-out loss in Game 6.

2022–23 season: Second All-Star appearance
On December 2, 2022, Brown recorded 37 points, along with 14 rebounds and 5 assists in a 120–116 overtime loss against the Miami Heat. He sent the game to overtime by banking in his long 3 with 1.7 seconds to play in regulation. On December 13, Brown posted 25 points, a season-high 15 rebounds, 5 assists and 3 steals in a 122–118 overtime win over the Los Angeles Lakers. On December 25, Brown had 29 points, along with five rebounds and four assists in a 139–118 blowout win against the Milwaukee Bucks. He and Jayson Tatum (41 points) combined for 70 points in a game for the eighth time in their careers. 

On January 11, 2023, Brown scored a then season-high 41 points on 15-of-21 shooting from the field and grabbed 12 rebounds in a 125–114 win over the New Orleans Pelicans. It was the fifth 40-point game in Brown’s career and the 10th time that Brown and Tatum (31 points) combined to score 70+ points. The Celtics are undefeated in those games. On February 2, 2023, Brown was named to his second NBA All-Star Game. On March 6, Brown posted a near triple-double with 32 points, 13 rebounds and 9 assists in a 118–114 overtime loss against the Cleveland Cavaliers. On March 13, Brown scored a season-high 43 points in a 111–109 loss against the Houston Rockets.

Career statistics

NBA

Regular season

|-
| style="text-align:left;"|
| style="text-align:left;"|Boston
| 78 || 20 || 17.2 || .454 || .341 || .685 || 2.8 || .8 || .4 || .2 || 6.6 
|-
| style="text-align:left;"|
| style="text-align:left;"|Boston
| 70 || 70 || 30.7 || .465 || .395 || .644 || 4.9 || 1.6 || 1.0 || .4 || 14.5
|-
| style="text-align:left;"|
| style="text-align:left;"|Boston
| 74 || 25 || 25.9 || .465 || .344 || .658 || 4.2 || 1.4 || .9 || .4 || 13.0
|-
| style="text-align:left;"|
| style="text-align:left;"|Boston
| 57 || 57 || 33.9 || .481 || .382 || .724 || 6.4 || 2.1 || 1.1 || .4 || 20.3 
|-
| style="text-align:left;"|
| style="text-align:left;"|Boston
| 58 || 58 || 34.5 || .484 || .397 || .764 || 6.0 || 3.4 || 1.2 || .6 || 24.7 
|-
| style="text-align:left;"|
| style="text-align:left;"|Boston
| 66 || 66 || 33.6 || .473 || .358 || .758 || 6.1 || 3.5 || 1.1 || .3 || 23.6
|- class="sortbottom"
| style="text-align:center;" colspan="2"|Career
| 403 || 296 || 28.7 || .473 || .373 || .712 || 4.9 || 2.0 || .9 || .4 || 16.5
|- class="sortbottom"
| style="text-align:center;" colspan=2| All-Star
| 2 || 0 || 25.7 || .615 || .421 || .333 || 9.5 || 3.0 || 2.0 || .0 ||bgcolor="EOCEF2" | 28.5

Playoffs

|-
| style="text-align:left;"|2017
| style="text-align:left;"|Boston
| 17 || 0 || 12.6 || .479 || .217 || .667 || 2.1 || .8 || .4 || .1 || 5.0
|-
| style="text-align:left;"|2018
| style="text-align:left;"|Boston
| 18 || 15 || 32.4 || .466 || .393 || .640 || 4.8 || 1.4 || .8 || .6 || 18.0
|-
| style="text-align:left;"|2019
| style="text-align:left;"|Boston
| 9 || 9 || 30.4 || .506 || .350 || .767 || 5.8 || 1.1 || .7 || .2 || 13.9
|-
| style="text-align:left;"|2020
| style="text-align:left;"|Boston
| 17 || 17 || 39.5 || .476 || .358 || .841 || 7.5 || 2.3 || 1.5 || .5 || 21.8
|-
| style="text-align:left;"|2022
| style="text-align:left;"|Boston
| 24 || 24 || 38.3 || .470 || .373 || .763 || 6.9 || 3.5 || 1.1 || .4 || 23.1
|- class="sortbottom"
| style="text-align:center;" colspan="2"|Career
| 85 || 65 || 31.3 || .474 || .364 || .753 || 5.5 || 2.0 || .9 || .4 || 17.2

College

|-
| style="text-align:left;"|2015–16
| style="text-align:left;"|California
| 34 || 34 || 27.6 || .431 || .294 || .654 || 5.4 || 2.0 || .8 || .6 || 14.6

Personal life and activism
Brown is primarily a vegetarian and has diverse interests including learning Spanish, studying history, meditation, and philosophy. He is also a big soccer fan as well as a big fan of anime. Many have described him as an unusual athlete, with many ambitions beyond basketball. Brown, who is African-American, assembled a primarily African-American advisory team prior to the NBA draft, but did not hire an agent. He was criticized by some as "too smart" to play in the NBA, with some scouts worrying he would grow tired of playing basketball and instead opt to pursue other career paths. This criticism was taken by some as racial bias against African-Americans.

When he was 22 years old, Brown became the National Basketball Players Association's youngest elected vice president. In recent years, he has spoken on the importance of education and technology at Harvard University, the University of California, Berkeley, and MIT. In 2019, Brown was named as a MIT Media Lab fellow and has since collaborated with the university to create the Bridge Program, which mentors Greater Boston youth and high school students of color, who are interested in pursuing careers in STEM programs. Through his work with MIT and his 7uice Foundation, Brown has taken a strong interest in tackling education and income inequality, among other social advocacy initiatives.

Brown's father is Marselles Brown, a professional boxer, who is the 2016 WBU World Champion, the 2015 WBU C.A.M. Heavyweight Champion, and a member of the Hawaii State Boxing Commission Board.

Brown has a YouTube channel, where he has posted several documentary-style video series depicting his life during the season and off-season workouts. The first episode, FCHWPO: Pawn to E4, was posted on January 31, 2017. The video title refers to Brown's love of chess. FCHWPO, which is also Brown's Twitter and Instagram handle, stands for Faith, Consistency, Hard Work Pays Off.

Brown is the cousin of professional football cornerback A. J. Bouye.

References

External links

 California Golden Bears bio
 USA Basketball bio

1996 births
Living people
2019 FIBA Basketball World Cup players
African-American basketball players
American men's basketball players
Basketball players from Marietta, Georgia
Boston Celtics draft picks
Boston Celtics players
California Golden Bears men's basketball players
McDonald's High School All-Americans
National Basketball Association All-Stars
Parade High School All-Americans (boys' basketball)
Small forwards
United States men's national basketball team players
21st-century African-American sportspeople